The 1st South Indian International Movie Awards were presented on June 22, 2012, in Dubai, UAE, to honour the best cinematic achievements of the South Indian film industry in the year 2011. Producing films in four Dravidian languages of South India, professionals were handed over a total of 71 Awards. The ceremony was hosted by R. Madhavan and Lakshmi Manchu at the Dubai World Trade Centre, while the "Generation Next Awards Night" was hosted by Parvathy Omanakuttan and held a day before at Park Hyatt on June 21.

Nominated by a jury, the final winners were decided by a public voting system. The most successful film was Dookudu, which fetched eight Awards in total.

Main awards

Film

Acting

Music

Debutant & Special Awards

Honorary awards 

SIIMA Lifetime Achievement Award: Ambareesh
SIIMA Award for Social Responsibility: Shivarajkumar

Generation Next awards 
 Sensational art director: Sabu Cyril
 Sensation of South Indian cinema: Dance choreographer Imran
 Sensation of South Indian cinema: Action Choreographer Peter Hein
 Stylish villain of South cinema: Sonu Sood
 Rising Female star of South Indian cinema: Amala Paul
 Rising Male star of South Indian cinema: Nani
 Stylish star of South Indian cinema: Lakshmi Rai
 Stylish actor of South Indian cinema: Silambarasan
 Pride of South Indian cinema: Shruti Haasan
 Youth icon of South Indian cinema: Rana Daggubati
 Youth icon of South Indian cinema: Anushka Shetty
 Sensation of South Indian cinema: Dhanush

References

External links
 

South Indian International Movie Awards
2011 Indian film awards